The Engenheiro José Mendes Júnior Hydropower plant, also known as Funil Hydropower plant, is a conventional hydroelectric power station administered by Aliança Geração de Energia S.A., a partnership between Vale and Cemig.  The Funil Plant has an installed capacity of 180MW with 89 MW of assured average energy in operation.

Location 
The plant is located on the Rio Grande, which belongs to the Rio Paraná basin, in southern Minas Gerais, between the municipalities of Perdões and Lavras.

Timeline 
The Funil Plant was built in 33 months and its first generating unit went into commercial operation within 27 months of implementation. The construction began in September, 2000, and ended in July, 2003, with the delivery of the third generating unit.
 1990: Formulation of Environmental impact Analysis and Report.
 Dec/1994: Preliminary License is granted.
 Sept/2000: Installation license is granted and start of construction.
 Nov/2002: Operation license is granted.
 Jan/2003: First generation unit goes operational
 Jun/2003: Second generation unit goes operational
 Jul/2003: Third generation unit goes operational
 Mar/2015: The power plant is integrated within the Aliança Geração de Energia S.A. partnership

Dam 
At its full operational capacity, the dam floods an area of 40,49 km², covering borders of 5 municipalities: Lavras, Perdões, Bom Sucesso, Ijaci e Ibituruna. The installed generation capacity of the plant is 180 MW with a hydraulic design head of 39 meters, utilizing Kaplan turbines.

This facility was the first in Brazil to implement a fishway in a structure of this kind to facilitate fish migration. It started operation in january 2004

References

External links 
 Official Website

Hydroelectric power stations in Brazil